is a Japanese professional footballer who plays as a goalkeeper for J1 League club Urawa Red Diamonds.

National team career
In June 2011, Niekawa was elected Japan U-17 national team for 2011 U-17 World Cup. He played 1 match against Argentina.

Club statistics

References

External links
Profile at Urawa Red Diamonds

1994 births
Living people
Association football people from Shizuoka Prefecture
Japanese footballers
J1 League players
J2 League players
J3 League players
Júbilo Iwata players
Sagan Tosu players
J.League U-22 Selection players
Thespakusatsu Gunma players
Azul Claro Numazu players
Mito HollyHock players
Urawa Red Diamonds players
Association football goalkeepers
Footballers at the 2014 Asian Games
Asian Games competitors for Japan